The 1928 South Dakota gubernatorial election was held on November 6, 1928. Incumbent Democratic Governor William J. Bulow ran for re-election to a second term. In the general election, he faced Attorney General Buell F. Jones, the Republican nominee. Despite Republican presidential nominee Herbert Hoover overwhelmingly defeating Democratic nominee Al Smith overwhelmingly in South Dakota, Bulow defeated Jones by a decisive margin to retain the governorship. In so doing, he became the first Democratic candidate for Governor to receive a majority of the vote in the state's history.

Democratic primary
Governor Bulow was renominated by the Democratic Party without opposition and no primary election was held.

Republican primary
In accordance with the complicated Richards primary law, which governed party nominations in South Dakota at the time, the Republican Party held a convention to select its statewide nominees; however, if a requisite number of delegates opposed the candidates selected by the majority, they could force a primary election to be held. Seven Republican candidates ran for the governorship:

 Lieutenant Governor H. E. Covey
 Attorney General Buell F. Jones
 State Auditor E. A. Jones
 State Senator Brooke Howell
 State Senator D. R. Perkins
 Former State Secretary of Agriculture B. F. Myers 
 C. M. Day, editor of the Argus Leader 

In the lead-up to the Republican convention, Jones, Day, and Howell were seen as the likeliest candidates, with the contest likely coming down to Jones and Day.

At the convention, Jones took a leading position, remaining in first place on the first ballot, but still standing several thousand votes short of victory. Over subsequent ballots, he got closer and closer, and lagging candidates removed themselves from contention. Only on the fifth ballot did Jones receive the requisite vote to win the nomination.

Farmer–Labor primary

Candidates
 John Sumption
 G. L. Hasvold

Campaign
At the March 1928 Farmer–Labor convention, John Sumption won the party's nomination; however, a minority faction at the convention favoring G. L. Hasvold dissented from Sumption's nomination and forced a primary. With just a few hundred voters turning out, Sumption defeated Hasvold to win the party's nomination.

Results

General election

Results

References

South Dakota
1928
Gubernatorial
November 1928 events in the United States